Tarletonbeania taylori, also known as the North Pacific lanternfish, is a species of lanternfish. It is found in the North Pacific. It grows to  standard length.

References

External links

Myctophidae
Fish of the Pacific Ocean
Fish described in 1953
Taxa named by Giles Willis Mead